Kolsås is the end station of the Kolsås Line on the Oslo Metro.

The station and line into Bærum was originally not built as a metro line but as the Lilleaker Line, built by Bærumsbanen. The station opened 1 January 1930. It was not until 1942 when the line became part of the heavier metro network. The station retains a turning loop for trams which can only run forwards.

The station is the one closest to the military base Kolsås leir, which was the former home of NATO's Allied Forces Northern Europe.

The station, along with most of the Kolsås Line was closed for maintenance, between 1 July 2006 and 12 October 2014. The station was also closed for over a year between 1 July 2003 and 22 November 2004.

References

External links

Aerial image of station (Google Maps)

Oslo Metro stations in Bærum
Railway stations opened in 1930
1930 establishments in Norway